Leonhard Machu (30 September 1909 – 31 October 1967) was an Austrian international footballer.

References

1909 births
1967 deaths
Association football midfielders
Austrian footballers
Austria international footballers
First Vienna FC players